The UK Albums Chart is a weekly record chart based on album sales from Sunday to Saturday in the United Kingdom. Albums are defined by the Official Charts Company (OCC) as being a type of music release that features more than four tracks and lasts longer than 25 minutes. During the 1970s, sales of albums in the United Kingdom were compiled on behalf of the British music industry by the British Market Research Bureau (BMRB). Panel sales from approximately 250 (later expanded to 450) representative record stores across the UK were collected each week, and a multiplier figure would then be applied to these panel sales figures to obtain an estimate of the total sales across the country and to compile the weekly chart. Each week's number one was first revealed at 12.45 pm on Thursdays on the lunchtime show on BBC Radio 1, and then moved to 6:05 pm (later 6:30 pm) on Wednesday evenings during the Peter Powell and Bruno Brookes shows.

The official charts of the best-selling singles and albums of the 1970s were compiled by BMRB and published in Music Week in the issue dated 22 December 1979, and the top 100 singles and albums were counted down throughout the day on Radio 1 on 31 December 1979, playing one track from each of the top 100 albums. As the charts had to be compiled before the end of the year, the cut-off date for collection of sales data was 8 December 1979.

The biggest-selling album of the 1970s in the UK was Bridge over Troubled Water by American duo Simon & Garfunkel. Released on 6 February 1970, it spent a total of 33 weeks at number one, and was the best-selling album of both 1970 and 1971. Originally it was credited with 41 weeks at number one, but this figure includes eight weeks in February and March 1971 when no charts were published due to a postal strike which prevented collection of sales data, and the chart of 30 January 1971 was reused during this period. In 2006 the OCC decided that the rival Melody Maker album chart would replace the missing weeks, with George Harrison's All Things Must Pass at number one during that period.

Although it was not an immediate big seller at the time and therefore does not appear in this list, Bat Out of Hell by Meat Loaf has since gone on to become one of the UK's best-selling albums. Released in the UK in February 1978, the album has only ever spent four weeks in the top ten of the album chart, two of them in 1981 in the wake of Meat Loaf's follow-up album Dead Ringer, and the other two in 2013 following Bat Out of Hells repackaging and re-release along with the Hits Out of Hell DVD. On both occasions the album peaked at number nine. However, Bat Out of Hell sold consistently for several years following its release, and has spent more than 500 weeks on the UK album chart, a total that, for a studio album, is bettered only by Fleetwood Mac's Rumours. As of February 2014 Bat Out of Hell is the 19th best-selling album of all time in the UK, and the third best-selling album released during the 1970s, behind Rumours and The Dark Side of the Moon and ahead of Bridge Over Troubled Water in fourth place.

BMRB's methodology and data collection system have been criticised by other chart statisticians. However, while other chart compilers have produced their own versions of the equivalent 1970s singles chart, BMRB's list remains the only chart of the best-selling albums of the 1970s.

Notes:

References
General (chart positions)
"Albums of the 70's". Music Week (London, England: Spotlight Publications). p. 15. 22 December 1979.

Specific

1970s (UK)
1970s in British music
Best-selling albums 1970s
1970s